Middlethorpe is a hamlet in the unitary authority of City of York in North Yorkshire, England.

The village was made a Conservation Area in 1975. Middlethorpe Hall dates from 1699 and Middlethorpe Manor from about 1700.

References

Villages in the City of York